Patrick Gallacher (9 January 1913 – June 1983), sometimes known as Paddy Gallacher, was a Scottish professional footballer who played in the Football League for Bournemouth & Boscombe Athletic and Blackburn Rovers as an inside forward. He also played in the Scottish League for Third Lanark and served League of Ireland club Dundalk as player-manager.

Personal life 
Gallacher was an uncle of footballers Billy McPhail and John McPhail. After retiring from football, Gallacher settled in Bexhill-on-Sea and became an HGV driver, a job from which he retired in December 1977.

Career statistics

Honours 
Third Lanark
 Scottish League Division Two: 1934–35
 Scottish Cup: runner-up 1935–36

Weymouth
 Western League First Division third-place promotion: 1948–49

Dundalk
 Leinster Senior Cup: 1950–51

References 

English Football League players
Brentford F.C. wartime guest players
Association football inside forwards
Scottish footballers
1913 births
1983 deaths
Footballers from Glasgow
Millwall F.C. players
Third Lanark A.C. players
Scottish Football League players
Blackburn Rovers F.C. players
AFC Bournemouth players
Weymouth F.C. players
Dundalk F.C. players
Dundalk F.C. managers
League of Ireland players
Southern Football League players
League of Ireland managers
Southern Football League managers
Western Football League players
Scottish football managers
People from Springburn
Notts County F.C. wartime guest players
Charlton Athletic F.C. wartime guest players
Aldershot F.C. wartime guest players
Fulham F.C. wartime guest players
Truck drivers